R. sylvestris may refer to:
 Rorippa sylvestris, the creeping yellowcress, keek, yellow fieldcress, a plant invasive species
 Rhus sylvestris, a synonym for Toxicodendron sylvestre, a plant species in the genus Toxicodendron found in China, Japan, Korea and Taiwan

See also
 Sylvestris (disambiguation)